The genus Glycera is a group of polychaetes (bristle worms) commonly known as bloodworms.  They are typically found on the bottom of shallow marine waters, and some species (e.g. common bloodworms) can grow up to 35 cm (14 in) in length.

Although both are visually similar and commonly used as fishing bait, bloodworms are biologically distinct from Lugworms.

Anatomy
Bloodworms have a creamy pink color, as their pale skin allows their red body fluids that contain haemoglobin to show through. This is the origin of the name "bloodworm". At the 'head', bloodworms have four small antennae and small fleshy projections called parapodia running down their bodies.

Bloodworms are carnivorous.  They feed by extending a large proboscis that bears four hollow jaws. The jaws are connected to glands that supply venom which they use to kill their prey, and their bite is painful even to a human. They are preyed on by other worms, bottom-feeding fish, crustacea, and gulls.

Reproduction occurs in midsummer, when the warmer water temperature and lunar cycle among other factors triggers sexually mature worms to transform into a non-feeding stage called the epitoke. With enlarged parapodia, they swim to the surface of the water where both sexes release gametes, and then die.

The first stage in many forms of bloodworm is a zooplanktonic stage followed by the benthic instar where the familiar segmented red larvae develop protected by silk tubes made in the bottom silt. These larvae progress from tiny pale opaque worms to the larger red larvae of 3 to 10 centimeters in length or longer over a period as short as 2–3 weeks in optimum conditions.

These animals are unique in that they contain a lot of copper without being poisoned. Their jaws are unusually strong since they too contain the metal in the form of a copper-based chloride biomineral, known as atacamite, in crystalline form. It is theorized that this copper is used as a catalyst for its venomous bite. In Glycera dibranchiata, the jaws are a composite of melanin and 10% copper.

Systematics
Glycera is the type genus of the family Glyceridae. It contains the following species:

Use by humans
Glycera worms are sold commercially in tackle shops as bait for saltwater fishing.

References

"Fishing for Allergens: Bloodworm-Induced Asthma" study at the Allergy, Asthma & Clinical Immunology (AACI) site

Polychaete genera
Phyllodocida

ru:Glycera alba